Hedwig of Mecklenburg-Güstrow (Hedwig Eleonore; 12 January 1666 – 9 August 1735), was a German noblewoman member of the House of Mecklenburg and by marriage Duchess of Saxe-Merseburg-Zörbig.

Born in Güstrow, she was the eighth of eleven children born from the marriage of Gustav Adolph, Duke of Mecklenburg-Güstrow and Magdalene Sibylle of Holstein-Gottorp. From her ten older and younger siblings, eight survive adulthood: Marie (by marriage Duchess of Mecklenburg-Strelitz), Magdalene, Sophie (by marriage Duchess of Württemberg-Oels), Christine (by marriage Countess of Stolberg-Gedern), Charles, Hereditary Prince of Mecklenburg-Güstrow, Louise (by marriage Queen of Denmark and Norway), Elisabeth (by marriage Duchess of Saxe-Merseburg-Spremberg) and Augusta.

Life
In Güstrow on 1 December 1686, Hedwig married Prince August of Saxe-Merseburg, second surviving son of Duke Christian I. Five years later (1691), August received the town of Zörbig as his appanage, and took his residence there.

They had eight children, of whom only one survived to adulthood:
Christiane Magdalene (Zörbig, 11 March 1687 - Merseburg, 21 March 1689).
Stillborn daughter (Alt-Stargard, Mecklenburg, 30 December 1689).
Caroline Auguste (Zörbig, 10 March 1691 - Zörbig, 23 September 1743).
Hedwig Eleonore (Zörbig, 26 February 1693 - Zörbig, 31 August 1693).
Gustav Frederick, Hereditary Prince of Saxe-Merseburg-Zörbig (Zörbig, 28 October 1694 - Zörbig, 24 May 1695).
August, Hereditary Prince of Saxe-Merseburg-Zörbig (Zörbig, 26 February 1696 - Zörbig, 26 March 1696).
Stillborn twin sons (1707).

Hedwig died in Zörbig aged 69. She was buried in Merseburg Cathedral.

See also
 BWV Anh. 16

References

|-

Hedwig
Hedwig
1666 births
Hedwig
1735 deaths
Daughters of monarchs